Zurich Film Festival (ZFF) is an annual film festival that has been held in Zürich, Switzerland, since 2005. The festival's main focus is to promote emerging filmmakers from all over the world. In three competition categories only first, second or third directoral works are admitted. There are three competition sections: International Feature Film, International Documentary Film and 'Focus: Switzerland, Germany and Austria' which focuses on these three production countries. Several industry events take place in the framework of the festival, such as the ZFF Academy or the international Zurich Summit, which have rendered the film festival an international platform for the film industry.

The ZFF is co-organized by the Zurich Film Festival AG, which is a member of the NZZ Mediengruppe, and the Spoundation Motion Picture AG, a marketing and event management company, in cooperation with local institutions, sponsors as well as national and international distributors and producers.

Nadja Schildknecht, Karl Spoerri and Antoine Monot Jr. founded the festival back in 2005. Until 2020 the festival was co-directed by Nadja Schildknecht (managing director) and Karl Spoerri (artistic director). The current artistic director is Christian Jungen, the managing director is Jennifer Somm.

In 2019, more than 100,000 visitors attended the screenings. In 2022 this record was broken as more than 137,000 visitors attended the festival, which featured 146 films from 49 countries.

History 
In 2004, Karl Spoerri and Tim Geser decided to bring the English digital film festival onedotzero_adventures in moving images to Zurich. From 29 to 31 October 2004, the festival was a guest at the Hochschule für Gestaltung und Kunst in Zurich. This small event developed into the Zurich Film Festival and its core team. In spring 2005, Karl Spoerri, Nadja Schildknecht and Antoine Monot, Jr. founded Spoundation Motion Picture GmbH, which has been running the Zurich Film Festival ever since and is headed by Karl Spoerri and Nadja Schildknecht. Antoine Monot, Jr. was Artistic Director from its inception until 2008, before handing over this role to Karl Spoerri.

The 1st Zurich Film Festival (5 to 9 October 2005) was held in the Plaza cinemas in Zurich. The main focus was on debuts - around eight first films were presented in a competition series. Other film series were called "Debut Classics" and "Züri Bellevue", among others. In its first year, the festival was already well received by the public and attracted 8,000 visitors - the press and the industry were still sceptical about the young festival. The "onedotzero_ch" series was part of the ZFF every year until 2011.

In 2006, the 2nd Zurich Film Festival (2 to 6 October 2006) the Golden Eyes were newly awarded in three competition categories (Best Newcomer Feature Film, Best Newcomer Documentary Film as well as Debut Feature Film). New programme sections included "New World View", which continues to this day. The 2nd ZFF already registered more than 18,000 viewers and over 600 accredited industry participants.

The young Zurich Film Festival took a big leap in 2007 when it was held for the first time over the length of 11 days. Over 50 world, European or Swiss premieres were presented on the "Film Mile" along the Limmat. The number of spectators rose to 27,000 within three years. For the first time, the Zurich Film Festival had a centre in the heart of the city: a large tent on Rathausplatz became the meeting place for cinema enthusiasts and filmmakers. In 2007, the festival was expanded to include the Zurich Coproduction Forum. From 2008 to 2012, the Zurich Film Festival continued to develop and the number of visitors doubled again.

In 2009, the Zurich Film Festival was overshadowed and at the same time made world famous by a particularly unfortunate incident. Guest of honour Roman Polański was arrested upon entering Switzerland and placed under house arrest for nine months. In 2011 he returned to the Zurich Film Festival to collect his honorary award two years late.

In 2011 a new festival centre was established on the Sechseläutenplatz. The Zurich Opera House has also been established as the venue for the Award Night. In 2011, the ZFF offered school screenings for the first time. In 2012, the ZFF included two films especially for children aged 6 and over and two films for primary school pupils in its programme for the first time.

Since August 2016, the NZZ media group has held a stake in Zurich Film Festival AG, the organiser of the Zurich Film Festival, and in the marketing organisation Spoundation Motion Picture AG.

Programme Sections

Competition 
In the competition, only first, second and third directorial works are presented in three categories (10-14 films each):

 Focus Competition (Switzerland, Germany, Austria)
 Feature Film Competition 
 Documentary Competition

Film selections out of competition 
Gala Premieres

In the "Gala Premieres" section, excitingly anticipated film premieres by established filmmakers are celebrated every evening mostly in the presence of the director and cast, with both feature film and larger documentary productions being shown. The films are presented as world, European, German-language or Swiss premieres.

Special Screenings

In the "Special Screenings" series, the Zurich Film Festival shows a selection of unique festival hits and brand-new films from the fields of fiction and documentary - whether artistic, experimental or taken from life.

Hashtag

The "Hashtag" section is dedicated to films that focus on current topics and themes that dominate conversations around the world. Various Feature and Documentary Films that shine a light on the issue from different angles will be presented. So far, the focus has been on the following topics:

#MyReligion (2022) | #letSEXplore (2021) | #GetUpStandUp (2020) | #SpeakingTheTruth (2019) | #BigData (2018)

New World View

The "New World View" programme puts a spotlight on a new generation of filmmakers from a selected production country that has provided some of the most innovative new filmmaking in recent years. The section has been dedicated to the following countries:

Spain (2022) | Tunisia (2021) | France (2020) | Colombia (2019) | Italy (2018) | Hungary (2017) | Mexico (2016) | Iran (2015) | India (2014) | Brazil (2013) | Sweden (2012) | Turkey (2011) | Australia (2010) | Argentina (2009) | Israel (2008) | Russia (2007)

Border Lines

The "Border Lines" section presents films dealing with border situations occurring in present-day world conditions, and humanitarian projects, territorial and social conflicts, and conflicts between individuals and the state. It is organized in collaboration with Amnesty International, Human Rights Partner of ZFF.

Window

The "Window" section comprises windows through which one can take a look at various cinematographic traditions. The "Hong Kong Window" presents a selection of unique and daring new films from Hong Kong ans is presented in collaboration with the Hong Kong Economic and Trade Office, Berlin. The "San Sebastián Window" presents a selection of four films from Spain and Latin America that were screened as part of the San Sebastián Film Festival.

Sounds

The "Sounds" section celebrates the relationship between film and music in all its diverse aspects. With an exquisite selection of feature and documentary films, for once the soundtrack takes center stage - whether the film shines its light on musicians, captivates with exceptional film music, or deals with the topic of sound in a very fundamental way. The program is complemented by two special screenings: One accompanied by live music and one with a live commentary by the film composer.

ZFF for Kids

At the 9th Zurich Film Festival, the children's programme was expanded with a separate audience award. The aim of the film series is to introduce children and young people to sophisticated film culture beyond the mainstream and to strengthen their media competence in a world dominated by images. Since 2020, there has been a year-round ZFF for Kids programme consisting of workshops and cinema screenings.

ZFF Series

At the 10th Zurich Film Festival in 2014, a section was introduced in which TV series are shown. Until the 13th edition, this was called "ZFF TVision" and was renamed "ZFF Series" in 2018. With the renaming, a separate small competition was started, which was held until 2020. In 2022, series were no longer shown in a separate section.

Guest of honour and Lifetime Achievement Awards

A Tribute to… 
The A Tribute to… Award honours filmmaking personalities who have had a significant influence on film history. The award winners receive the prize in person in Zurich and usually take part as speakers at the ZFF Masters, where they share their experiences and knowledge with the participants.

Golden Icon Award 
In 2008, the Golden Icon Award was presented for the first time. It's an award that honours the lifetime achievement of an actor or actress. This award goes to a person who has become the icon of an entire generation and whose performance and cinematic work has become unforgettable. Previous award winners include:

Career & Lifetime Achievement Awards 
The Career Achievement Award is presented to a personality who has distinguished himself or herself in the field of production, directing or interdisciplinarity. The award winners are honoured with a Golden Eye. The Lifetime Achievement Award honours the life and work of personalities from various fields who have particularly enriched and shaped filmmaking and film history.

Awards and jury 

 Golden Eye: In each category, a separate, internationally composed jury awards a Golden Eye for the best film. The prize is worth CHF 25,000 (international feature and documentary film competition) or CHF 20,000 (focus). In addition, the winning films will receive promotional measures for distribution in Switzerland.
 Emerging Swiss Talent Award: All Swiss productions (1st, 2nd or 3rd feature film by the director) screening at the festival are nominated. The prize is endowed with CHF 10,000.
 Audience Award: The audience chooses their favourite film from all the competition entries by ballot and online voting, which is awarded the Audience Award at the Award Night.

Jury members 
The Golden Eyes are awarded by an international competition jury, which views the films together with the audience during the festival in Zurich. The jury is not bound by any special guidelines in awarding the prizes, but only one film per category can be awarded a Golden Eye.

Award winners 

The Zurich Film Festival awards the Golden Eye to the winners of the competition on the last Saturday of the event during a festive Award Night at the Zurich Opera House. Further prizes are awarded by external juries.

Industry events

Zurich Summit 
The Zurich Summit, launched in 2014, traditionally takes place on the first weekend of the Festival at the Dolder Grand Hotel. The boutique conference offers a unique platform in the German-speaking world that brings together high-profile representatives from the entertainment and film sectors with investors and the financial world. Topics include production and investment strategies, film financing and risk minimisation, distribution and European co-productions.

ZFF Academy 
The ZFF Academy, founded in 2006 under the name ZFF Master Class, serves to promote and network talented directors, screenwriters and/or producers. Interested parties can apply for a place in the ZFF Academy. Around 30 invitations are issued each year. In some cases, recordings can be found on YouTube.

Speakers until the 18th ZFF (2022) included:

Events

ZFF Masters 
The ZFF Masters are moderated talks with well-known personalities (directors, screenwriters, producers and actors) from the international film industry. The audience gains an insight into their creative work and their attitude as filmmakers. The ZFF Masters are open to the public and are aimed at the film industry as well as the entire festival audience. Many interviews can be viewed afterwards on the ZFF Channel on YouTube.

Speakers until the 18th ZFF (2022) included:

International Film Music Competition 
The International Film Music Competition, first held in 2012, is an integral part of the Zurich Film Festival and is organised by the Tonhalle Orchestra Zurich in collaboration with the Forum Filmmusik. The competition is aimed at composers worldwide. The task is to compose music for a short film. The three best submissions will be premiered at a film music concert at the Zurich Film Festival. An international jury of experts awards the Golden Eye, worth CHF 10,000, for the best international film music.

Former events 
Treatment Competition

In 2013, Schweizer Radio und Fernsehen (SRF) and Telepool launched a treatment competition in cooperation with the Zurich Film Festival. Authors could submit a treatment for a feature-length cinema or television film. The work had to have a strong connection to Switzerland - be it in terms of content, characters or production conditions. The prize for the treatment competition was CHF 5,000. In addition, the winner received a development contract worth up to CHF 25,000 to write a script for a long feature film for TV or cinema.

ZFF 72

ZFF 72 was an online film competition organised by the Zurich Film Festival until 2020. Participation was open to all film enthusiasts. At ZFF 72, filmmakers had 72 hours to produce a maximum 72-second clip. The Zurich Film Festival provided the theme for the clip. The choice of genre was free: everything from scenic films and documentary formats to CGI and stop-motion was permitted. The winners were the Jury Award, determined by a jury of experts, and the Viewers Award, which was determined by online voting.

References

External links 
 

Film festivals in Switzerland